TechOlympics is an information technology (IT) conference for high school students. It connects students with IT professionals and with companies in order to promote the field of IT. The conference was originally held at the Millennium Hotel but has been held at the Great American Ballpark in Cincinnati, Ohio since the Millennium closed down, excepting the 2020 event which was held virtually due to the global pandemic. The event is run by the INTERalliance of Greater Cincinnati, a non-profit organization seeking to empower students through a robust knowledge of IT. Colleges and other organizations are present at the event as well. Schools often attend as groups, but individual attendance is also permitted. The conference takes place over the course of one weekend, starting of Friday and going until midday Sunday. The events that take place during the conference fall into one of five categories: a Breakout, a Competition, a Workshop, a Showcase Demonstration, or a Speaker Presentation. However, there are other events that do not fit into one of these categories. Each year, the theme of the conference changes, and as such, so do the Breakouts and competitions offered, as well as the speakers presenting.

Breakouts
TechOlympics offers the opportunity for students to learn from professionals through breakouts. Breakouts are talks that typically last one hour long and generally focus on IT. A selected list of topics covered in past breakouts is provided below.

 Chatbots
 Cloud computing
 Network security
 Making a technology startup
 Agile software development
 Data analytics
 Professionalism
 Artificial intelligence
 Augmented reality
 Graphic design and product design

Competitions
TechOlympics is home to many competitions ranging from Wikiracing to competitive hacking. Below is a selected list of competitions.

 Wikiracing
 Tech Trivia
 Hacker Heaven
 QR Code Scavenger Hunt
 Speed Keyboarding
 Web Design
 Kerbal Space Race
 iMovie
 Code Golf
 Art and Technology

Showcase Demonstrations
A showcase project is large project that a group of students, often from the same school, take part in working on, in order to present the project to a panel of judges. This project is in competition with other projects to be the best project submitted. Winning this event is seen as a very important feat during the conference.

Workshops 
For the past few years TechOlympics has offered workshops, bringing in professionals to teach students a skill. A selected list of past topics can be found below.

 Unity (Game Engine)
 Abre App Development
 Python (programming language)
 JavaScript
 Lockpicking
 LinkedIn Training
 GitHub Training
 Capture The Flag

Speaker Presentations
Generally, after each meal, students will hear from a speaker, often one with an IT background, that discusses the merits of entering the IT field.

References

Technology conferences
Events in Cincinnati
Student events